The Empress is a not for profit theatre in Fort Macleod, Alberta that has been open since 1912.

History
In January 1910 the Lethbridge Herald announced that a new opera house with orchestra pit would be built And it opened in 1912 as a vaudeville and theatrical performance venue for North-West Mounted Police.

Architecture
It is a two-story brick building with a plain facade to match the existing streetscape. It still has its original interior balcony, seating, dressing rooms and projection booth.

It is registered on the Canadian Register of Historic Places.

References

1912 establishments in Alberta
Theatres in Canada
Heritage sites in Alberta